Dean Wallis (born 27 August 1969) is a former Australian rules footballer for the Essendon Football Club of the AFL.

Originally from Nhill, due to his physical style of play Wallis became known as one of the AFL's toughest players. He won premierships with the club in 1993 and 2000, and played 127 VFL/AFL games in his 14 seasons with the Bombers.

After retiring as a player, he became an assistant coach. In 2002 and 2003, Wallis was an assistant coach to Grant Thomas at St.Kilda before again returning to Windy Hill to take up an assistant coaching role. He left the club after Matthew Knights was appointed as senior coach in 2008, and he moved to the Fremantle Football Club as an assistant coach. At the conclusion of the 2010 AFL season, he returned to Essendon as a development coach, following Knights' replacement as senior coach by James Hird.

In 2011, Wallis was suspended from coaching for 14 games and fined $7500 by the AFL for betting on league games in violation of anti-gambling rules. In 2015, Dean took up the senior coaching role of Essendon Doutta Stars in the EDFL and was a premiership coach in his first year at the helm. In 2016, Wallis continued as senior coach at Essendon Doutta Stars.

His son, Tom, was drafted by Essendon in the 2016 rookie draft under the father–son rule.

Playing statistics

|- style="background-color: #EAEAEA"
! scope="row" style="text-align:center" | 1987
|style="text-align:center;"|
| 21 || 11 || 2 || 0 || 76 || 38 || 114 || 21 || 31 || 0.2 || 0.0 || 6.9 || 3.5 || 10.4 || 1.9 || 2.8
|-
! scope="row" style="text-align:center" | 1988
|style="text-align:center;"|
| 21 || 13 || 9 || 3 || 81 || 30 || 111 || 29 || 23 || 0.7 || 0.2 || 6.2 || 2.3 || 8.5 || 2.2 || 1.8
|- style="background:#eaeaea;"
! scope="row" style="text-align:center" | 1989
|style="text-align:center;"|
| 21 || 9 || 2 || 6 || 67 || 38 || 105 || 27 || 14 || 0.2 || 0.7 || 7.4 || 4.2 || 11.7 || 3.0 || 1.6
|-
! scope="row" style="text-align:center" | 1990
|style="text-align:center;"|
| 21 || 0 || — || — || — || — || — || — || — || — || — || — || — || — || — || —
|- style="background:#eaeaea;"
! scope="row" style="text-align:center" | 1991
|style="text-align:center;"|
| 21 || 7 || 1 || 1 || 42 || 33 || 75 || 14 || 15 || 0.1 || 0.1 || 6.0 || 4.7 || 10.7 || 2.0 || 2.1
|-
! scope="row" style="text-align:center" | 1992
|style="text-align:center;"|
| 21 || 12 || 6 || 11 || 78 || 34 || 112 || 48 || 20 || 0.5 || 0.9 || 6.5 || 2.8 || 9.3 || 4.0 || 1.7
|- style="background:#eaeaea;"
|style="text-align:center;background:#afe6ba;"|1993†
|style="text-align:center;"|
| 21 || 8 || 2 || 7 || 45 || 21 || 66 || 27 || 8 || 0.3 || 0.9 || 5.6 || 2.6 || 8.3 || 3.4 || 1.0
|-
! scope="row" style="text-align:center" | 1994
|style="text-align:center;"|
| 21 || 1 || 1 || 1 || 4 || 1 || 5 || 2 || 2 || 1.0 || 1.0 || 4.0 || 1.0 || 5.0 || 2.0 || 2.0
|- style="background:#eaeaea;"
! scope="row" style="text-align:center" | 1995
|style="text-align:center;"|
| 21 || 2 || 0 || 0 || 4 || 3 || 7 || 1 || 0 || 0.0 || 0.0 || 2.0 || 1.5 || 3.5 || 0.5 || 0.0
|-
! scope="row" style="text-align:center" | 1996
|style="text-align:center;"|
| 21 || 12 || 6 || 3 || 55 || 46 || 101 || 33 || 25 || 0.5 || 0.3 || 4.6 || 3.8 || 8.4 || 2.8 || 2.1
|- style="background:#eaeaea;"
! scope="row" style="text-align:center" | 1997
|style="text-align:center;"|
| 21 || 11 || 0 || 1 || 63 || 26 || 89 || 27 || 7 || 0.0 || 0.1 || 5.7 || 2.4 || 8.1 || 2.5 || 0.6
|-
! scope="row" style="text-align:center" | 1998
|style="text-align:center;"|
| 21 || 1 || 0 || 0 || 3 || 0 || 3 || 1 || 0 || 0.0 || 0.0 || 3.0 || 0.0 || 3.0 || 1.0 || 0.0
|- style="background:#eaeaea;"
! scope="row" style="text-align:center" | 1999
|style="text-align:center;"|
| 21 || 23 || 10 || 4 || 119 || 78 || 197 || 52 || 34 || 0.4 || 0.2 || 5.2 || 3.4 || 8.6 || 2.3 || 1.5
|-
|style="text-align:center;background:#afe6ba;"|2000†
|style="text-align:center;"|
| 21 || 16 || 3 || 1 || 79 || 57 || 136 || 54 || 18 || 0.2 || 0.1 || 4.9 || 3.6 || 8.5 || 3.4 || 1.1
|- style="background:#eaeaea;"
! scope="row" style="text-align:center" | 2001
|style="text-align:center;"|
| 21 || 1 || 0 || 0 || 0 || 0 || 0 || 0 || 1 || 0.0 || 0.0 || 0.0 || 0.0 || 0.0 || 0.0 || 1.0
|- class="sortbottom"
! colspan=3| Career
! 127
! 42
! 38
! 716
! 405
! 1121
! 336
! 198
! 0.3
! 0.3
! 5.6
! 3.2
! 8.8
! 2.6
! 1.6
|}

References

External links

Essendon Football Club players
Essendon Football Club Premiership players
1969 births
Living people
Australian rules footballers from Victoria (Australia)
Nhill Football Club players
Two-time VFL/AFL Premiership players